EGroupware is free open-source groupware software intended for businesses from small to enterprises. Its primary functions allow users to manage contacts, appointments, projects and to-do lists.
The project releases its software under the terms of GNU General Public License (GPL).

It is used either via its native web-interface, making access platform-independent, or by using different supported groupware clients, such as Kontact, Novell Evolution, or Microsoft Outlook. It can also be used by mobile phone or PDA via SyncML.

It currently has translations for more than 25 languages, including right-to-left language support.

Features
EGroupware is developed in the script language PHP/TypeScript and is therefore platform-independent (Linux, Windows). Open source databases (MariaDB, PostgreSQL or also MySQL) can be used as databases. Authentication can be done against the own user accounts in SQL as well as LDAP, mail server, Active Directory (AD), CAS, SAML 2.0/Shibboleth/SimpleSAMLphp and others.

Comparable programs are proprietary groupware servers such as Microsoft Exchange or Lotus Domino. 

EGroupware can manage mail servers (Dovecot, Cyrus). User administration, e-mail accounts, absence notes/filters(via Sieve), mail aliases, quotas and forwardings are directly administrable in EGroupware or can be set by the user. A suitable e-mail server is offered as an installation package.

History
EGroupware is the most current manifestation of a chain of projects.  The original project was called webdistro.  In 2000 development on the project phpgroupware began, which was based on webdistro; and in 2003 the EGroupware fork was born.  EGroupware has a very pronounced community character compared with its predecessors.

There is an EGroupware constitution, adopted in 2005, which guarantees freedom and security to the community and establishes admin elections.

For a short time Tine 2.0 was an official subproject of EGroupware. The goal of the subproject was the development of future technologies for the EGroupware project. Due to internal disagreements, the projects EGroupware and Tine 2.0 had separated from each other in February 2008.

Since July 2009 the first professional Version of EGroupware is available. It is being sold as a software subscription. This product line, called „EGroupware Premium Line“ (EPL) includes a maintenance agreement for the source code and corresponding RPMs, that enables automatic updates.

Version 14.2 ist is available since December 2014. E-Share-Option: Since version 14.2 EGroupware Filemanager offers a filesharing option for an easy data exchange. It includes, for example, the option to send links to read or edit files to persons that do not use EGroupware. Beside that, files can be moved via drag and drop. Filemanager is used as an  alternative to the filehosting service Dropbox. Home Screen: The Home Screen is a virtual pinboard, that makes important contacts, projects or tasks always available for the user. Mobile Template: The third update in 14.2 is the mobile template, that has been optimized for small screens and touch handling. It enables the usage of EGroupware on tablets and supports swipe gestures and an adaptation of the format while turning the device.

For 2016 the Release of version 16.1 is scheduled. It will for example include a new calendar and further improvements of the mobile template.

Version 20.1 was released on 12 August 2020. It integrated a new smallPART application for video-based learning & teaching. A push server was implemented and the source code was converted to TypeScript.
Even before the release of version 20.1, the video conferencing solution Jitsi and the web remote desktop solution Apache Guacamole were integrated due to the Corona pandemic.

Version 21.1 was released on 25 May 2021. The module smallPART (video-based learning tool) now supports tests and exams with single-choice, Multiple choice and open text questions. New additions include an integrated Kanban board and cloud telephone system integration (CTI). Further innovations: EGroupware Firewall Dark Mode, File sharing for internal users, EGroupware Mail server.

Applications and functions 
 Contact-manager using an SQL database or LDAP
 Calendar (including support for scheduling of groups, resources and contacts)
 Integrated IMAP webmail client (FelaMiMail)
 Infolog, an application for tasks and notes
 File manager
 File sharing
 Kanban board
 Knowledge base
 Element based project manager highly integrated with all other apps
 Resources management (inventory) and booking tool integrated into EGroupware calendar
 Wiki
 SiteMgr: web based authoring system with fine granulated access control lists
 CalDAV and CardDAV server
 News
 Time-tracker application
 Bookmarks
 Tracking system

Other included/connected applications:
 Chat (Rocket.chat)
 Video conference (Jitsi/BigBlueButton)
 Remote desktop (Apache Guacamole)
 Online office suite (Collabora Online)
 smallPART

Characteristics/Qualities 
EGroupware is being developed in PHP and therefore platform independent (Linux, Windows, BSD Server). Several open source databases (as MySQL, MariaDB, PostgreSQL) are usable. Authentication can occur via private user accounts in SQL or LDAP, or an external system, for example Mailserver or Active Directory Server (ADS).

Comparable programmes are proprietary groupware servers such as Microsoft Exchange or Lotus Domino.

Synchronisation 
EGroupware can be synchronised with Apple- and Android devices. Appointments, addressbook entries and tasks from Infolog application can be synchronised. ESync and CalDAV are thereby used as protocols.

See also 

 List of collaborative software#Open source software compares its features with others
 List of project management software

Screenshots

Literature 
 Ralf Becker, Birgit Becker, Michaela Knotte, Ingo Kreißelmeyer: Manual EGroupware 1.4, English, Outdoor Unlimited Training GmbH, 1.Edition, January 2008, 
 Ralf Becker, Birgit Becker, M. Knotte, I. Kreißelmeyer: Benutzerhandbuch EGroupware 1.4, German, Outdoor Unlimited Training GmbH, 1. Edition, August 2007,

References

External links
 
 EGroupware Community Edition
 

Groupware
Free groupware
Business software for Linux